Thyestilla is a genus of longhorn beetles of the subfamily Lamiinae, containing the following species:

 Thyestilla coerulea Breuning, 1943
 Thyestilla gebleri (Faldermann, 1835)

References

Saperdini